Elinav is a surname. Notable people with the surname include:

 Eran Elinav (born 1969), Israeli immunologist
 Shira Elinav (born 2000), Israeli footballer

Hebrew-language surnames